A walkover is an automatic victory awarded if there are no other players available.

Walkover may also refer to:

 Uncontested election, where all candidates are elected by default
 Walkover (film), a 1965 Polish film
 Back walkover, an acrobatic maneuver
 Front walkover, an acrobatic maneuver